Pehlivan is a 1984 Turkish drama film directed by Zeki Ökten. It was entered into the 35th Berlin International Film Festival where Tarık Akan won an Honourable Mention.

Cast
 Tarık Akan as Bilal
 Yavuzer Cetinkaya
 Tulug Çizgen
 Erol Günaydin as Mestan
 Ahmet Kayiskesen as Bilal's father
 Yaman Okay as Tevfik
 Meral Orhonsay

References

External links

1984 films
Films set in Turkey
1980s Turkish-language films
1984 drama films
Films directed by Zeki Ökten
Turkish drama films